Água Branca is a municipality located in the western of the state of Alagoas. Its population 20,230 (2020) and its area is 455 km².

Climate

References

Municipalities in Alagoas